Anastasiia Olegovna Riabtseva (born 17 January 1996) is a Russian female handball player for HC Astrakhanochka and the Russian national team.

She also represented Russia in the 2016 Women's Junior World Handball Championship, 2015 Women's U-19 European Handball Championship and at the 2013 European Women's U-17 Handball Championship, were she received silver all three times. She also won silver medal at the 2014 Summer Youth Olympic in Nanjing.

She was awarded for the World Female Young Handball Player 2016/17 as Goalkeeper, by Handball-Planet.com.

Achievements
Russian Super League
Gold Medalist: 2016
Bronze Medalist: 2015, 2018
Russian Cup
Silver Medalist: 2016
Bronze Medalist: 2017, 2018
Russian Super Cup
Silver Medalist: 2016
EHF Champions League:
Fourth place: 2014/15
Youth Olympics:
Silver Medalist: 2014
World Junior Championship:
Silver Medalist: 2016
European Junior Championship:
Silver Medalist: 2015
European Youth Championship:
Silver Medalist: 2013

References

Weblinks 
 Profile of the Russian Handball Federation
 Profile on HC Astrakhanochka
 

1996 births
Living people
Russian female handball players
People from Krasnodar
Handball players at the 2014 Summer Youth Olympics
21st-century Russian women